The Victorian Philharmonic Orchestra is an Australian orchestra. It is affiliated with the Melbourne Symphony Orchestra, and in 1999 had about 60 musicians. The orchestra has collaborated with numerous artists, including Australian alternative rock band, Jebediah and Indonesian artist Chrisye.

References

Australian orchestras